Warford Hall is a country house in the village of Great Warford, Cheshire, England. It was designed by W. Roberts, and built in 1867 for J. C. Rowley.  It is a large house in the Italianate style, constructed of red brick and Alderley Edge stone.  On its front is a tower porch set on the skew.

The house serves as the residence of former footballer Ashley Ward and his wife, Dawn Ward, who appeared on The Real Housewives of Cheshire, a reality television series. The Wards have been seeking to develop the property, and they submitted plans in July 2021 to convert some outbuildings into six dwelling units.

References

Country houses in Cheshire
Houses completed in 1867